Mill Creek is a  long 2nd order tributary to French Creek in Mercer and Venango County, Pennsylvania.

Course
Mill Creek rises on the North Deer Creek divide about 3 miles north-northeast of New Vernon, Pennsylvania in Mercer County.  Mill Creek then flows easterly into Venango County to meet French Creek at Utica, Pennsylvania.

Watershed
Mill Creek drains  of area, receives about 43.4 in/year of precipitation, has a topographic wetness index of 444.64, and has an average water temperature of 8.19 °C.  The watershed is 58% forested.

See also 
 List of rivers of Pennsylvania
 List of tributaries of the Allegheny River

References

Additional Images

Rivers of Mercer County, Pennsylvania
Rivers of Venango County, Pennsylvania
Rivers of Pennsylvania
Tributaries of the Allegheny River